The Rural Municipality of Baildon No. 131 is a rural municipality (RM) in the Canadian province of Saskatchewan within Census Division No. 7 and  Division No. 2. It is located in the south-central portion of the province south of Moose Jaw.

History 
The RM of Baildon No. 131 incorporated as a rural municipality on December 9, 1912.

Geography 
The Cactus Hills are in the RM.

Communities and localities 
The following communities are located in the RM.

 Archive
 Baildon
 Buttress
 Crestwynd
 Leakville
 Levuka
 Tilney

Demographics 

Attractions 
Sukanen Ship Pioneer Village and Museum
The Diefenbaker House is the childhood home of Prime Minister of Canada, John Diefenbaker-turned-museum located in the city of Prince Albert. The museum building was built in 1912 and purchased in 1947 by the Prime Minister of Canada, John Diefenbaker and his then wife Edna Diefenbaker. It was closed in 2001 and moved to the Sukanen Ship and Pioneer Museum in 2004.

Government 
The RM of Baildon No. 131 is governed by an elected municipal council and an appointed administrator that meets on the second Wednesday of every month. The reeve of the RM is Charlene Loos while its administrator is Carol Bellefeuille. The RM's office is located in Moose Jaw.

See also 
List of rural municipalities in Saskatchewan
List of communities in Saskatchewan

References 

B
Division No. 7, Saskatchewan